The 2006 Kisima Music Awards were held in Nairobi, Kenya. They were the first of the awards to be broadcast across Africa on television, after the organisers partnered with South African satellite station Channel O, and was also the first to feature a "Social Responsibility" award category. The event encountered controversy when at least five artists refused to play at a later charity concert, citing that they had not entered a performing contract with the Kisima Music Trust. The motto for the ceremony was "Our Heritage of Splendor", and featured acts included Juma Nature, Obsessions and Nameless.

Winners

See also
Kisima Music Awards

External links
2006 Kisima Award Winners

References

Kisima Music Award winners